Thasana Chamsa-ad (born November 21, 1982) is a former professional footballer from Thailand.

References

1982 births
Living people
Tassana Cheamsa-art
Tassana Cheamsa-art
Association football defenders
Tassana Cheamsa-art
Tassana Cheamsa-art
Tassana Cheamsa-art
Tassana Cheamsa-art
Tassana Cheamsa-art
Tassana Cheamsa-art